Bandora may refer to:

 Bandora (instrument)
 Bandora, Goa, a town in Goa, India
 The Bandora Gang, characters in the Super Sentai series, Kyōryū Sentai Zyuranger